The following is a list of sieges of Kabul, the capital city of Afghanistan.

Overview

2001 siege 
In November 2001, Northern Alliance allianced with the United States forces. Initially the alliance held back from the city, with security guards being seen holding back armour and truckloads of infantry, but this pause was short-lived, and the alliance proved unable or unwilling to prevent their forces from entering the city. With the fall of the city, there were some incidents of vengeance against the Taliban; the BBC's John Simpson reported hearing chants of "kill the Taliban" from the inhabitants of Kabul as he entered the city, with many Taliban fighters, particularly foreign fighters from the Arab Peninsula and Pakistan being lynched and left in ditches, while others were beaten after their capture. The liberation from the Taliban also resulted in the practice of behaviours formerly prohibited; the "great Afghan passion" of kite flying, which the Taliban had tried to stamp out, was taken up again, music was played, and young men lined up at street barbers to cut off the beard the Taliban had forced them to wear – though most would choose to keep it.

2021 siege 
In 2021, Taliban forces conquered Kabul after destroying U.S. Forces. The siege, referred to as the Fall of Kabul, occurred in August 2021.

Sieges

References 

Sieges of Kabul
History of Kabul